Before the Game was an Australian rules football comedy panel television show which aired on Network Ten on 1 March 2003 until 27 September 2013. The show was hosted by Andrew Maher with regular panelists Mick Molloy, Dave Hughes, Anthony Lehmann and Neroli Meadows. The format of the show was light-hearted discussion and analysis of Australian Football League (AFL) news and views and included appearances by current players.

History

After the Game (2003)
Before the Game first aired on 1 March 2003 as After the Game. During the existence of After the Game, the show was rated M and contained occasional profanity. The show was a cult hit. One notable act was when the After the Game team shaved Fraser Gehrig's mullet off at the end of the 2003 Season.

Before the Game (2004–2013)

Following the show's success in its late time slot, it was moved to a  time slot on 27 March 2004. When it moved to the primetime slot, to make it more 'family-friendly', it was given a PG rating.

The show originally aired in between the Saturday afternoon and Saturday night telecasts on Ten. Following the end of the 2011 season, the fate of Before the Game was unknown, as Ten had lost its AFL broadcast rights to the Seven Network. However, in 2012, Ten confirmed the show would return, with the entire panel from the previous year in its regular 6:30pm time slot, and that the format may be altered slightly. This was similar to the Nine Network's decision to keep The Footy Show after it lost AFL broadcast rights at the end of the 2006 season. On 21 June 2012, Before the Game moved from Saturdays at 6.30pm to Thursdays at 8.30pm in Victoria, South Australia and Western Australia, and it also aired on One at 10.30pm in New South Wales and Queensland.

In 2013, Before the Game returned to its original time slot of 6:30pm on Saturday. The game broke new ground on 24 August 2013, when it screened on One, the Ten Network's digital channel. The Ten Network was contractually bound to telecast the Bledisloe Cup rugby union test series live on its main channel, hence the change. Fox Sports presenter Neroli Meadows joined the panel in 2013, replacing Sam Lane, who left to join the Seven Network for its Saturday night AFL coverage.

The show was axed on 13 December 2013.

Presenters

Host
 Andrew Maher (2005–2013)

Regular panelists
 Mick Molloy (2007-2013)
 Dave Hughes (2003-2013)
 Anthony Lehmann (2004-2013)
 Neroli Meadows (2013)

Ryan ‘Fitzy’ Fitzgerald, and Peter Helliar, playing Bryan Strauchan/‘Strauchanie’, make regular cameo appearances.

Former panelists
 Anthony Hudson (2003–2004)
 Bryan Strauchan 
 Peter Helliar (2003–2006)
 Sam Lane (2003–2012)
 Damian Callinan (2003)

Recurring segments

Tool of the Week
The "Tool of the Week" is an award given by Dave Hughes and sponsored by Home Hardware. The award was given to a particularly embarrassing performance by somebody related to the AFL, either on or off the field. The "best" or most memorable of these tools is given the "Tool of the Year".

Headlines you might have missed
Each week, panel members took turns at reading out humorous, fictional football-related newspaper headlines. This usually involved The Australian, The Age and Herald Sun newspapers.

Holden round the Block
In 2013, a new segment called 'Holden round the Block' started. Lehmo and either Mick Molloy or Dave Hughes pick up a player and chatted while they cruised around a local neighbourhood.

BTG Super Spray
This segment began in 2013 and involved Dave Hughes attending a selected team's training and 'stirring them up' with humorous asides about their club and various players. Hughes would reprise this role on The Footy Show.

The Clean Team
This segment, started in 2013, involved highlighting in a humorous way players who could not possibly be involved with alleged drug problems, allegedly involving certain AFL clubs.

In Da House with Strauchanie
In 2013, fictional former Collingwood hopeful and football tragic, Bryan "Strauchanie" Strauchan (played by Peter Helliar), returned for an occasional segment called 'In Da House with Strauchanie'.

Lehmo's Footy Clinic
In this segment, Lehmo talks about a particular football skill, then shows footage of a player embarrassingly stuffing it up.

Former segments

Fitzy's Make A Wish Foundation
Ryan Fitzgerald would go to a child's house as a surprise. Fitzy took them to their supported clubs and/or to meet their favourite player(s). Footballers involved have included Bryan Strauchan, Brendan Fevola, Scott West, Jason Akermanis and Adam Selwood.

Until the Fat Lady Sings
When the show started, there was a segment called "The Game's Not Over Until the Fat Lady Sings", where an overweight lady would go to a game and sing when she thought that the game was over. This segment was scrapped due to the fat lady being fired for singing after the siren had gone. The part of the fat lady was played by Pauline Smith (née Henderson).

Diary of a Footballer
"Diary of a Footballer" was a segment in which a well-known footballer would read out a page of their diary.

Jumping in Hot Water
Sponsored by Aquamax, a company that produces water heating units, a football player had to answer ten questions about the history of their football club. The junior football club of the player with the highest score at the end of the year would receive a hot water system.

The segment was replaced by Inside 60 in 2007, a segment that had appeared on the show in much earlier seasons.

Inside 60 with Dave Hughes
This involved Hughes asking questions, most of them being funny, in which many players continually laugh. It lasted 60 seconds, finishing with a siren.

Banners
In the Banners segment, each comedic panelist created a banner for a specific football club, often to reflect events scrutinised by the media.

Bryan Strauchan's earlier segments
Bryan Strauchan was formerly a regular segment on the show following fictional talentless, egotistical "youngster" Bryan Strauchan (played by Peter Helliar) as he tried to make a career for himself at the Collingwood Football Club. The segments were presented as a mockumentary and featured similar comedy stylings to The Office and similar shows. He also used the catchphrase "Strauchanie", usually when he was referring to himself.

Bryan Strauchan is also known as Bryan "Superstar" Strauchan and "Strauchanie". On the 2006 Grand Final episode of Before the Game, he was involved in a Wayne Carey-like incident, and this forced him to leave the Collingwood Football Club and look for a new home in 2007. Strauchanie had expressed an interest in the Western Bulldogs, but he would not rule out a move to the Kangaroos. Strauchanie looked far from making his AFL debut match, but he did not give up the hard work he has shown at Collingwood Football Club. Bryan Strauchan's overwhelming success on this show has led to him releasing a DVD: Strauchanie: Pure BS.

Production details
Before the Game was produced by Roving Enterprises, the TV production company owned by Rove McManus, an Australian television personality who appeared on his own comedy/interview show Rove, formerly known as Rove Live. Peter Helliar and Dave Hughes were also regulars on the show. The program was filmed at Channel Ten studios in Melbourne.

See also

References

Network 10 original programming
10 Sport
Australian comedy television series
Australian rules football television series
2003 Australian television series debuts
2013 Australian television series endings
Television shows set in Victoria (Australia)
English-language television shows